Tuan Chau Aquarium is an aquarium located on Tuan Chau Island in Ha Long Bay, Vietnam. The structure itself reflects a very modern style of architecture.

External links
Photos

Aquaria in Vietnam
Buildings and structures in Quảng Ninh province
Tourist attractions in Quảng Ninh province